Sunan Muria (or Muria) is, according to the Babad Tanah Jawi ("History of the land of Java") manuscripts, one of the Wali Sanga ("Nine Saints") involved in propagating Islam in Indonesia.

He was born as Raden Umar Said, as the son of Raden Said (Sunan Kalijaga).

A big distinction of Sunan Muria - apart from the other Sunans - is his very-close-relationship to common people. He tend to spread his teaching in rural and remote areas, including teaching local 
people in agriculture, fishery, and other things.

His name is used as the name of the nearby mountain, Mount Muria.

See also

Islam in Indonesia
The spread of Islam in Indonesia

References

Sunyoto, Agus (2014). Atlas Wali Songo: Buku Pertama yang Mengungkap Wali Songo Sebagai Fakta Sejarah. 6th edition. Depok: Pustaka IIMaN. 

History of Islam in Indonesia
Wali Sanga